Serhat Mustafa Kılıç (born 8 July 1975) is a Turkish actor and TV presenter.

Life and career 
In 1994, Kılıç enrolled in Bilkent University School of Music and Performing Arts, Theater Department with a scholarship. He graduated with honors from this school in 1998. His first professional experience on stage was an adaptation of Ariel Dorfman's play Widows in 1998, directed by Rutkay Aziz, at the Ankara Art Theatre. He worked at Diyarbakır State Theatre between 1999 and 2000. In the same years, he gave acting lessons at Diyarbakır City Theatres and directed the play Barış Adası at the same institution. In 2002, he was appointed to the Erzurum State Theatre as an actor to complete his compulsory service. In 2005, he completed his master's degree at Hacettepe University Ankara State Conservatory and started teaching as a lecturer at Erzurum Atatürk University, Faculty of Fine Arts, Department of Theatre. In 2008, he resigned from his position at the State Theatres and started to continue his studies in Istanbul. Among the venues he has worked at while in Istanbul are Tiyatro Dot and BKM. During the 2009–2010 season, he joined the Istanbul City Theatres with the play Generalna proba samoubstiva. It went on stage at Istanbul City Theatres for 3 seasons as a closed box office. Kılıç was nominated for the Most Successful Musical and Comedy Male Actor of the Year at the 14th Afife Theatre Awards, for his performance in this play in which he portrayed four different characters. In 2012, he founded a production company called Cats & Dogs (Soho Istanbul). He portrayed the character of Imam Hamdi in the movie Winter Sleep, directed by Nuri Bilge Ceylan. With his performance in this film, he was nominated for the Best Supporting Actor award at the 47th SİYAD Awards. In November 2014, he founded the Serhat Kılıç School, which provides lessons on acting, writing, dance and vocal training.

Theatre

As actor 
 Gece Sempozyumu - Eric De Volder - 2018 - director: Mesut Arslan 
 Tek Kişilik Şehir - Behiç Ak - Serhat Kılıç Sahne Ankara - 2018 - director: Serhat Nalbantoğlu
 Terror - Ferdinand von Schirach - Serhat Kılıç Sahne Ankara - 2018 - director: Yücel Erten
 Generalna proba samoubstiva : Dušan Kovačević - Istanbul City Theatres - 2009 - director: Nurullah Tuncer
 Shoot/Get Treasure/Repeat : Mark Ravenhill - Tiyatro Dot - 2008 - director: Murat Daltaban 
 More Plays than One : Michael Frayn - Beşiktaş Cultural Center - 2007 - director: Mehmet Ergen
 Bug : Tracy Letts - Tiyatro Dot - 2006 - director: Murat Daltaban
 Karımla Evleniyorum : Ephraim Kishon - Erzurum State Theatre - 2005 - director: Levent Ulukut
 The Good Doctor : Anton Chekhov - Erzurum State Theatre - 2005 - director: Emre Erçil
 Memurin Faslı : Coşkun Irmak - Erzurum State Theatre - 2004 - director: Abdullah Indır
 As You Like It : William Shakespeare - Erzurum State Theatre - 2004 - director: Zurab Siharulidze
 The Ride Down Mt. Morgan : Arthur Miller - Erzurum State Theatre - 2003 - Abdullah Ceran
 Scapin the Schemer : Molière - Erzurum State Theatre - 2003 - director: Ahmet Mümtaz Taylan
 A Month in the Country : Ivan Turgenev - Ankara State Theatre - 2002 - director: Zurab Siharulidze
 Azizname : Yücel Erten - Ankara State Theatre - 2000 - director: Yücel Erten
 Ghetto : Yehoshua Sobol - Ankara State Theatre - 2000 - director: Erhan Gökgücü
 The Government Inspector : Nikolai Gogol - Diyarbakır State Theatre - 1999 - director: Zurab Siharulidze
 A Midsummer Night's Dream : William Shakespeare - Diyarbakır State Theatre - 1999 - director: Semih Sergen
 Widows : Ariel Dorfman - Ankara State Theatre - 1998 - director: Rutkay Aziz
 Barış Adası Korsanlara Karşı : Hakan Güven - Ankara State Theatre - 1998 - director: Hakan Güven

 As director 

 Pıtlatan Bal : Aziz Nesin - Erzurum State Theatre - 2004 
 Barış Adası : Hakan Güven - Diyarbakır City Theatre - 1999

 Filmography 
 Film 
 Mavzer - 2020 (Veysi)
 Topal Şükran'ın Maceraları - 2019 - (Selim)
 Çember: Ateş Üstünde - 2019 - (Adem Yılmaz)
 Robinson ve Cuma: Gürcan Yurt - 2015 - Robinson  
 Veda : Zülfü Livaneli - 2010 - Salih Bozok
 Nokta : Derviş Zaim - 2008 - Selim
 Kış Uykusu : Nuri Bilge Ceylan - 2014 - Imam Hamdi
 Baskın Karabasan : Can Evrenol - 2015 - Policeman

 TV series 
 2021-2022 Kurulus: Osman (Mihail Koses)
 2021 - Maraşlı (Necati Türel)
 2020 - Öğretmen (Taner Aslan)
 2017–2019 - Söz (Çolak)
 2017 - Çember (Commissioner Adem)
 2012–2016 - Seksenler (Ergun Plak)
 2010–2011 - Ezel (Selim Uğurlu)
 2009 - Benim Annem Bir Melek (İbadullah)
 2008–2009 - Yol Arkadaşım (İlker Elmastaş)
 2006 - Hatırla Sevgili (Kamil Gündüz)
 2000 - Bizim Evin Halleri (Karl Gurur)

 TV programs 

 Mutluluğun Anahtarı\Küçük Şeyler - TRT1 - 2000–2007
 Uyanık Bar - FOX TV - 2009–2010
 Heberler (with Memet Ali Alabora, Levent Kazak, and Mahir İpek) - Turkmax - 2010–2013
 Paranoyak (TV shov)]] TV 8 - 2011
 İnan Bana - Star TV - 2013
 Büyük Risk - Show TV - 2014
 Görevimiz Komedi - FOX TV - 2016
 Çok Tatlı - Kanal D - 2018

 Radio programs 

 Geceden Sabaha (with Gaye Filiz Çele) - Ankara TRT FM - 2000–2001
 Baykuş & Karga (with Erdem Akakçe) - Green Radio - 1994–1997
 Radio Night & Day - Ankara FM - 1992–1994

 Awards 
20th Sadri Alışık Theatre and Cinema Awards – Selection Committee Special Award (Kış Uykusu'')

References

External links 

1975 births
Turkish male stage actors
Turkish male film actors
Turkish male television actors
Living people
Male actors from Ankara
Bilkent University alumni